Le Lit à colonnes is a French drama film from 1942, directed by Roland Tual, written by Charles Spaak, starring Fernand Ledoux and Jean Marais. The scenario was based on a novel of Louise de Vilmorin. In Finland the film was distributed under the title "Ristikon sävel" (realisation 7 February 1947).

Cast 
 Fernand Ledoux: Porey-Cave
 Michèle Alfa: Aline
 Odette Joyeux: Marie-Dorée
 Jean Marais: Rémi Bonvent
 Jean Tissier: Jacquot
 Pierre Larquey: Ten-Fingers
 Mila Parély: Yada
 Georges Marchal: Olivier de Verrières
 Emmy Lynn: the Countess of Verrières
 Valentine Tessier: Madame Porey-Cave
 Jacqueline Champi: Marguerite de Verrières
 Huguette Donga: Elise
 Georges Cadix: Little Maurice

References

External links 
 

1942 films
French drama films
1940s French-language films
French black-and-white films
1942 drama films
1940s French films